Rohan Nishantha Weerakkody (born 30 April 1968) is a former Sri Lankan cricketer. Making his known debut for the Sri Lankan Young Cricketers side (the original name of the Sri Lankan U-19 cricket team), he went on to captain the side on 7 occasions during the 1987/88 Youth World Cup, winning 3 matches but losing 4 and failing to qualify beyond the Group Stage. He went on to play domestic cricket professionally for Nondescripts Cricket Club at both First-class and List A level.

He played primarily a bowler, with a good bowling average in the low 20s-high 10s at senior level.

References

External links

Sri Lankan cricketers
1968 births
Living people
Nondescripts Cricket Club cricketers